The Woolfolk State Office Building is a high-rise government office building in Jackson, Mississippi, USA. It was designed in the Art Deco architectural style by Emmett J. Hull, Edgar Lucian Malvaney, Frank P. Gates and Ransom Carey Jones, and it was completed in 1949. It is currently the tenth-tallest building in Jackson.

References

Government buildings completed in 1949
Art Deco architecture in Mississippi
Skyscraper office buildings in Jackson, Mississippi